Albert Tebbit (26 December 1871 – March 1938) was a British speed skater. He competed in two events at the 1924 Winter Olympics.

References

1871 births
1938 deaths
British male speed skaters
Olympic speed skaters of Great Britain
Speed skaters at the 1924 Winter Olympics
People from Waterbeach